is a Japanese professional footballer who plays as a centre back for J1 League club Sagan Tosu.

Club statistics
.

References

External links

Profile at Sagan Tosu

1993 births
Living people
Hosei University alumni
Association football people from Saitama Prefecture
Japanese footballers
J2 League players
FC Gifu players
Tochigi SC players
Sagan Tosu players
Association football defenders